Microliabum is a genus of South American flowering plants in the family Asteraceae.

 Accepted species
 Microliabum candidum (Griseb.) H.Rob. - Argentina (Tucumán, San Luis, La Rioja, Catamarca)
 Microliabum eremophilum (Cabrera) H.Rob.  - Argentina (Tucumán, Salta)
 Microliabum humile (Cabrera) Cabrera - Argentina (Jujuy, Salta)
 Microliabum mulgediifolium (Muschl.) H.Rob. - Bolivia
 Microliabum polymnioides (R.E.Fr.) H.Rob. - Bolivia, Argentina (Jujuy, Salta, Catamarca, Tucumán)

References

Flora of South America
Liabeae
Asteraceae genera
Taxa named by Ángel Lulio Cabrera